Robert Jean Hubert Bayot (born 4 September 1915, date of death unknown) was a Belgian fencer. He competed in the team sabre events at the 1948 and 1952 Summer Olympics.

References

1915 births
Year of death missing
Belgian male fencers
Belgian sabre fencers
Olympic fencers of Belgium
Fencers at the 1948 Summer Olympics
Fencers at the 1952 Summer Olympics